Georg Rörer (Latin: Georgius Rorarius) (October 1, 1492, Deggendorf – April 24, 1557 Jena) was a German Lutheran theologian, clergyman and Protestant reformer.

Georg Rörer began his studies at Leipzig University in 1511.  He was awarded his Magister in 1520. From 1522, he continued his studies at the University of Wittenberg, where he met Martin Luther, Philipp Melanchthon and Johannes Bugenhagen. He was one of the first clergymen ordained to the office of deacon by Martin Luther in 1525.

He assisted as proof-reader in Martin Luther's work of translating the Bible (1522–1545) into the German language.  He also served as Luther's secretary. In 1537, John Frederick I, Elector of Saxony exempted him from his ecclesiastical duties and officially commissioned him to work with the documentation of Luther's work. In this capacity, Rörer became one of the editors of Luther's Tischreden ("table talk") as well as a collected edition of Luther's works. He moved to Copenhagen in 1551 and to Halle in 1553.

References

Other sources
Kroker, Ernst  Röhrers Handschriftenbände und Luthers Tischreden. Archiv für Reformationsgeschichte (ARG)
Georg Rörer (1492–1557) Der Chronist der Wittenberger Reformation	(Evangelische Verlagsanstalt)

External links
The cultural memory of the Reformation - The collection of Georg Rörer (The Collection of Georg Rörer (1492-1557) in the Thuringian State and University Library at Jena) 

1492 births
1557 deaths
16th-century German people
16th-century Lutheran clergy
German Protestant Reformers
People from Deggendorf
People from the Duchy of Bavaria
German male non-fiction writers
German translators